Christian Gessner (or Geßner; born 16 June 1968) is a retired German swimmer who won three medals in the 200 m and 400 m medley at the 1991 European Aquatics Championships and 1991 World Aquatics Championships. Next year, he finished fifth in the same events at the 1992 Summer Olympics.

References

1968 births
German male swimmers
Swimmers at the 1992 Summer Olympics
Olympic swimmers of Germany
Living people
World Aquatics Championships medalists in swimming
European Aquatics Championships medalists in swimming
Male medley swimmers
Sportspeople from Gera